Gangi is a village in Kishanganj district in the Indian state of Bihar.

References 

Villages in Kishanganj district